Velbon (full name: Velbon Tripod Co., Ltd.) is a manufacturer of photographic accessories, specialising in tripods.

Based in Japan and established in the 1950s, it has three manufacturing facilities, one each in Myanmar, China, and Yamanashi, Japan.

External links
Official site

Photography equipment
Photography companies of Japan